The 2012 Kent State Golden Flashes football team represented Kent State University in the 2012 NCAA Division I FBS football season. They were led by second-year head coach Darrell Hazell and played their home games at Dix Stadium as a member of the East Division of the Mid-American Conference.

The Flashes had their most successful season since their MAC championship season of 1972, winning the MAC East outright with an 8–0 record, and made it to the MAC Championship game where they lost, 44–37, to Northern Illinois in double-overtime. The team peaked at #18 in the BCS polls, finishing the regular season at #25. Kent State earned their first bowl bid since 1972, and played in the GoDaddy.com Bowl against Arkansas State.  The Golden Flashes were defeated by the Red Wolves, 17–13.

Schedule

Source: Schedule

Rankings

Game summaries

Towson

This game is notable for a play that happened in the last minute of the second quarter. Kent State punted from the 50-yard line, and the ball touched, but was not caught by, Towson's returner, Derrick Joseph. It hit the ground and was recovered at the 7-yard line by Kent State linebacker Andre Parker, who then ran 58 yards the wrong way before two Towson players tackled him. However, a muffed punt cannot be advanced (or retreated) so Kent State simply took possession of the ball at the 7-yard line for the remainder of the half, and kicked a field goal before it ended.

@ Kentucky

@ Buffalo

Ball State

@ Eastern Michigan

@ Army

Western Michigan

@ #15 Rutgers

Akron

@ Miami (OH)

@ Bowling Green

Ohio

#19 Northern Illinois (MAC Championship Game)

Arkansas State (GoDaddy.com Bowl)

References

Kent State
Kent State Golden Flashes football seasons
Kent State Golden Flashes football